Andrzej Strugarek (born 25 October 1958) is a Polish former football player and manager who played as a midfielder.

References

1958 births
Living people
People from Drezdenko
Polish footballers
Association football midfielders
Lechia Zielona Góra players
Lech Poznań players
GKS Katowice players
Ekstraklasa players
Polish football managers
Lech Poznań managers